Vincenzo Pennazza (born 19 October 1984) is a South African-born Italian cricketer. Pennazza is a right-handed batsman who bowls left-arm medium pace. He was born at Paarl, Cape Province.

While still living in South Africa, Pennazza played five Youth One Day Internationals for South Africa Under-19s, with his first appearance coming on tour against England Under-19s at the County Ground, Hove. His further four appearances came in the 2004 Under-19 World Cup, playing against Uganda Under-19s, England Under-19s, India Under-19s, and West Indies Under-19s. He later qualified to play for Italy, owing to his Italian heritage. His first appearance for Italy came against a Leinster Cricket Union President's XI in a warm up match for the 2008 European Cricket Championship Division One, in which Pennazza played four matches. He was then selected as part of Italy's squad for the 2008 World Cricket League Division Four in Tanzania, making six appearances. He took 8 wickets in the tournament at an average of 17.25, with best figures of 2/10. With the bat, he scored 78 runs at a batting average of 14.40, with a high score of 31. His next appearance for Italy came in the 2011 World Cricket League Division Three in Hong Kong, with Pennazza included in Italy's thirteen man squad. He played in five out of six of Italy's matches in the tournament, taking 8 wickets at an average of 30.12, with best figures of 3/72. With the bat, he scored 47 runs at an average of 15.66, with a high score of 18.

He was later selected as part of Italy's sixteen man squad for the 2012 World Twenty20 Qualifier in the United Arab Emirates. He made his Twenty20 debut in the tournament against Oman, with Pannazza making eight further appearances, the last of which came against Kenya. In his nine matches, he took 8 wickets at an average of 23.50, with best figures of 2/11. With the bat, he scored 17 runs at an average of 5.66, with a high score of 12. Italy finished the tournament in tenth place and therefore missed out on qualification for the 2012 World Twenty in Sri Lanka. In April 2013, he was selected in Italy's fourteen man squad for the World Cricket League Division Three in Bermuda.

References

External links
Vince Pennazza at ESPNcricinfo
Vince Pennazza at CricketArchive

1984 births
Living people
Sportspeople from Paarl
South African emigrants to Italy
South African people of Italian descent
Italian cricketers
Italian sportspeople of African descent